is a town in Saihaku District, Tottori Prefecture, Japan. , the town had an estimated population of 10,420 in 3871 households and a population density of 75 persons per km². On the west side of the train tracks just after leaving Hōki-Mizoguchi station, a very large green statue of an Oni is visible on the hill overlooking the town and the Hino River. Before the Kishimoto-Mizokuchi town merger which created Hōki, the oni was Mizokuchi's town mascot and as such is featured on manhole covers, phone booths, post boxes and even the town's highway rest stop (where the building housing the restrooms is shaped like a giant oni head).

Geography
Hōki is located in the Chūgoku Mountains in western Tottori Prefecture.  The major road through Hōki is Route 181 which winds through the mountains from Yonago all the way to Okayama prefecture in the south. For the majority of its length it's a two lane highway and features steep switchbacks and often abrupt vertical drops to the valleys below. It roughly parallels the course of the Hino River until it reaches neighboring Kōfu, where Route 181 continues south, and Route 183 continues west to Nichinan and eventually Hiroshima, the capital of the Chūgoku region.

Neighboring municipalities
Tottori Prefecture
Yonago
Daisen
Nanbu
Hino
Kōfu

Climate
Hōki is classified as a Humid subtropical climate (Köppen Cfa) characterized by warm summers and cold winters with heavy snowfall.  The average annual temperature in Hōki is 13.0 °C. The average annual rainfall is 1883 mm with September as the wettest month. The temperatures are highest on average in August, at around 24.8 °C, and lowest in January, at around 1.6 °C.

Demography
Per Japanese census data, the population of Kōfu has been as follows.

History
The area of Hōki was part of ancient Hōki Province. During the Edo Period, it was part of the holdings of the Ikeda clan of Tottori Domain. Following the Meiji restoration. the area was organized into villages within Hino District and Saihaku District, Tottori on October 1, 1889 with the establishment of the modern municipalities system.  Hōki was formed on January 1, 2005 as the result of the merger of the town of Kishimoto, from Saihaku District, and the town of Mizokuchi, from Hino District.

Government
Hōki has a mayor-council form of government with a directly elected mayor and a unicameral town council of 14 members. Hōki, collectively with the other municipalities of Saihaku District, contributes three members to the Tottori Prefectural Assembly.. In terms of national politics, the town is part of Tottori 2nd district of the lower house of the Diet of Japan.

Economy
The economy of Hōki is primarily agricultural with some light manufacturing.

Education
Hōki has four public elementary schools and two public junior high schools operated by the town government. The town does not have a high school, and typically take a cus to neighboring Yonago.

Transportation

Railway 
 JR West - Hakubi Line
  -

Highways 
  Yonago Expressway

Local attractions
Shōji Ueda Museum of Photography

Noted people from Hōki
Shōji Ueda, photographer

References

External links

 Hōki official website 
 Shoji Ueda Museum of Photography 
 Shoji Ueda Museum of Photography

Towns in Tottori Prefecture
Hōki, Tottori